Karl Martin Widmark (born 19 March 1961) is a Swedish children's writer and teacher. His books about LasseMaja junior mysteries, in English named The Whodunit Detective Agency, have been translated from Swedish into 34 languages. Eight of them have been translated into English and published by Grosset and Dunlap. Several of his books about the Whodunit Detective Agency have been adapted to film in Sweden, and they have also been made into board games, theater and video games.
he was Emils pick
Martin Widmark was born in Sturefors and grew up in Linköping, but has lived in Stockholm since the 1980s. He has taught middle school and also Swedish for immigrants. He writes children's books and teaching materials including works on weird stuff and hes weird.

Martin Widmark is involved in issues concerning reading comprehension of children and young people and was the initiator of the project A Reading Class (En läsande klass) which was launched in 2012, together with several publishers and the Junibacken Foundation. He has made more than a thousand visits to different schools and classrooms and was in August 2014 awarded the Swedish government's medal Illis Quorum for his books and work with children and young people's reading.

In the year 2000, Widmark made his debut with the book "To catch a tiger" (Att fånga en tiger). Since then he has written over hundreds of books for children and young people and is today one of Sweden's most popular children's book writers with almost 10 million books sold. His books have been translated into almost 40 different languages.

Bibliography

Young adult books

2008 - Kabinettets hemlighet

Picture Books 
2000 - Att fånga en tiger (with Joakim Lindengren)'2006 - Att lura en elefant (with Kiran Maini Gerhardsson)
2006 - Från himmelens topp till havets botten (with Pietro Galeoto)
2009 - Drömmarnas park (with Marco Trisorio)
2011 - Fånga farliga djur (illustrator: Kristina Grundström)
2016 - Lilla Sticka i landet Lycka (illustrator: Emilia Dziubak)
2017 - Huset som vaknade (illustrator: Emilia Dziubak)
2018 - Den långa vandringen (illustrator: Emilia Dziubak)

LasseMajas detektivbyråSee main article: The Whodunit Detective AgencyRakel (with Britt Sternehäll)
2005 - Sjörövar-Rakel och kapten Snorfinger2006 - Riddar-Rakel och de tre stordåden2007 - Racer-Rakel och fångarna i svinstian2008 - Mirakel-Rakel Rekordmamma2008 - Rymd-Rakel och Gubben i månen2009 - Charter-Rakel och Fuskhajarna2010 - Upptäckar-Rakel och den okända kungens gravNelly Rapp (with Christina Alvner)
2003 - Monsterakademin2003 - Frankensteinaren2004 - Varulvarna2005 - Trollkarlarna från Wittenberg2006 - Spökaffären2007 - De vita fruarna på Lovlunda slott2008 - Häxdoktorn - och den sista zombien2009 - Sjöodjuret i Bergsjön2010 - I Bergakungens sal2011 - Snömannens hemlighet2012 - De spökande prästerna 
2013 - Vampyrernas bal2014 - Trollkarlens bok 
2014 - Kapten Blåskägg2015 - Nelly Rapp och häxornas natt2016 - Nelly Rapp och de små under jorden2017 - Nelly Rapp och gastarna i skolan2018 - Nelly Rapp och näckens hemlighet2019 - Nelly Rapp och det hemliga biblioteketDavid and Larissa (illustrator: Katarina Strömgård)
2006 - Antikvariat Blå spegeln2006 - Den trettonde gästen2007 - Dårarnas ö2008 - Nåjdens sång2009 - Under en himmel av glasI elfte timmen:2007 - Tvättade pengar (with Petter Lidbeck)
2007 - Lyckans hjul (with Lidbeck)
2008 - Bröllop och barn (with Lidbeck)
2008 - Förbjuden fruktTyko Flores äventyr (illustrator: Henrik Tamm)
2011 - Den dansande djävulen2011 - Fyrtornet i Son-Li2011 - Polyhymnias guldHalvdan Viking (illustrator: Mats Vänehem)
2011 - Hövdingens bägare2012 - Främlingens grav2013 - Vargens hjärta2013 - Forsens drottning2014 - Miklagårds lås2014 - Isens gud2015 - De sju brödernas skatt2016 - Munkens löfte2017 - Ulfberhts svärd2018 - Halvdan och Meia. Bland trälar och gudar - äventyr och fakta om vikingar

Emma and Larry (with Kristina Grundström)
2008 - Huset på Alvägen
2008 - Vägen till skatten
2009 - Ben och Koko söker jobb
2010 - Den försvunna elefanten

Little Extra-series (with Kristina Grundström)
2013 - Hitta den rätta
2013 - Alla ljuger
2014 - Rocky vår hjälte
2015 - Rädda Harry!
2015 - Fotboll på liv och död

Other
2017 - Talmannens hämnd (with Petter Lidbäck) (illustrator: Pelle Forshed)
2017 - I rosens mitt (illustrator: Ola Skogäng)

References

External links
Official website
Info about Martin Widmark and Helena Willis on LasseMaja's website
Bibliography

Swedish children's writers
Living people
1961 births
Swedish-language writers
Swedish educators
Recipients of the Illis quorum